Chaïm El Djebali (born 7 February 2004) is a Tunisian professional footballer who plays as a midfielder for Lyon B. Born in France, he plays for the Tunisia national team.

Career
El Djebali is a youth product of the academies of Vaulx-en-Velin, ES Trinité Lyon, and Lyon. He was promoted to their reserves in 2021, and signed his first professional contract with the club on 30 June 2022, tying him to the club until 2025.

International career
Born in France, El Djebali was born to a Tunisian father and Algerian mother. He represented the France U16s once in 2019. In September 2022, he accepted a call-up to the senior Tunisia national team for a set of friendlies. He made his debut with Tunisia as a late substitute in a 1–0 friendly win over Comoros on 22 September 2022.

References

External links
 
 

2004 births
Living people
People from Décines-Charpieu
Tunisian footballers
Tunisia international footballers
French footballers
France youth international footballers
Tunisian people of Algerian descent
French sportspeople of Tunisian descent
French sportspeople of Algerian descent
Association football midfielders
Olympique Lyonnais players
Championnat National 2 players